Ty the Tasmanian Tiger is a 2002 3D platforming game developed by Krome Studios and published by EA Games for the GameCube, PlayStation 2 and Xbox systems. The game was remastered in HD for Microsoft Windows and was made available through Steam in 2016. A remastered version was also developed for the Nintendo Switch, PlayStation 4, Xbox One, and Xbox Series X/S. The Nintendo Switch version released in North America in March 2020, and in Europe, Australia, and New Zealand the following month. The PlayStation 4 version was released on 25 July 2020. The Xbox One and Xbox Series X/S version was released on 14 October 2020.

The first installment in the Ty the Tasmanian Tiger series, the game is set on a fictional Australian island and follows the titular character Ty as he searches for "Thunder Eggs" to power a machine to locate five scattered talismans and free his family, who are trapped in an alternate realm known as "The Dreaming" by the series antagonist Boss Cass, a cassowary plotting world domination. Development of Ty the Tasmanian Tiger began in 2000 with five developers from Krome Studios. The development team was later expanded to 45 people. For the levels in the game, the developers got inspiration from the Australian Outback.

The game was initially revealed in 2002 at the Electronic Entertainment Expo convention in Los Angeles, California. Ty the Tasmanian Tiger received mixed reviews from critics. The game sold over one million copies worldwide. Three sequels were produced: Ty the Tasmanian Tiger 2: Bush Rescue, Ty the Tasmanian Tiger 3: Night of the Quinkan and Ty the Tasmanian Tiger 4.

Gameplay
Ty the Tasmanian Tiger is a platform game in which the player controls Ty, a Tasmanian tiger, who must gather mystical artifacts known as "Thunder Eggs" in order to power the Talisman Machine, a teleportation device that will locate five mystical talismans which will in turn have the power to free his family from the Dreaming, which an evil character named Boss Cass opened to seal all mammals. The game takes place in "Rainbow Cliffs", which is divided into a series of "zones", each of which act as the hub areas of the game. Each zone contains three portals which lead to a level, similar to Crash Bandicoot. The goal of each level is to obtain Thunder Eggs, which can be retrieved by either performing a certain task, completing a "Time Attack" challenge that can be unlocked upon a level's completion, freeing five bilbies (a group of animals who raised Ty after his parents were imprisoned), or by being found alongside the level's set path. A level is cleared either by collecting a select number of Thunder Eggs and reaching the end of the path, or beating certain mini-games, each will return Ty to Rainbow Cliffs. Retrieving a Thunder Egg in a level will cause it to appear on the game's pause menu. When at least 17 Thunder Eggs in a zone are obtained, the player navigates their way to the Talisman Machine; after the machine manages to locate a talisman, it opens another portal leading to their original locations; inside these portals, the player must fight and defeat a boss before gaining access to a new zone.

The player is given a certain number of lives, which are usually lost when Ty is attacked by an enemy or falls from a great distance. The game ends when lives are lost, although the player can continue from the last level played. Ty has the ability to jump into the air and uses both biting and throwing his trademark dual boomerangs as his primary means of defense. The player begins the game with two wooden boomerangs, but can gradually increase their collection by finding secret areas, or collecting 15 "Golden Cogs" scattered throughout each level and trading them to Ty's scientist koala friend Julius, who creates a new "techno-rang" for the player to use. Another method of retrieving a new boomerang is to complete a boss level, after which Julius will harness the excess energy of the Talisman Machine in order to create a new "elemental boomerang", each of which possess elemental powers that can be used to gain access to a new zone. Like elemental-rangs, each techno-rang possesses a unique ability, and can alternatively be used to defeat enemies or retrieve Golden Cogs or Thunder Eggs more efficiently. In early levels of the game, Ty can swim via doggie paddle; however, following the third level, "Ship Rex", the player gains the ability to swim faster and more efficiently as well as dive underwater from lifeguard platypus character Rex; in addition, Rex gives the player "Aquarangs", boomerangs used exclusively for attacking underwater.

Plot
In Australia, the evil cassowary, Boss Cass, enters the Outback to steal the 5 mystical talismans so he can become the country's ruler, but is confronted by a family of boomerang-wielding Tasmanian tigers and they fight for control of the talismans. When Cass opens a portal to the Dreaming to imprison the tigers, Ty's father throws his Doomarang to dislodge the talismans, destroying the portal and scattering the talismans. Having become the last of his kind, Ty is adopted as an orphan by the bilbies. Several years later, Ty inadvertently falls into a cave while playing with the bilbies and encounters the Bunyip elder Nandu Gili, who informs him about his true heritage and Cass's plans to obtain the talismans again. Ty resolves to finding the missing talismans, rescue his family and defeat Cass. He is aided in his mission by Maurice, his cockatoo friend.

At Bli-Bli Station, Ty befriends Julius, a koala scientist who has invented a device that will find the Talismans. Because Thunder Eggs are required to power the device, Ty must find the Thunder Eggs by visiting portals to other worlds. With Maurie's help, Ty finds a second boomerang at a billabong. At a rainforest, he helps save his dingo girlfriend, Shazza, and helps Ranger Ken by clearing the bats out of a cave, as well as learning to swim from the lifeguard Rex and find a wrecked ship on a tropical island. When Julius finds the first talisman, Ty encounters Bull, a boar. He tames Bull by luring him into the rocks and rescues the first talisman. At Julius' laboratory, Ty learns that Julius has developed elemental boomerangs by diverting the excess energy from the Fire Thunder Eggs through his Hyper Techno Boomerang Maker.

Ty makes his way through Pippy Beach by using his Flamerangs. He uses Bull to travel around the outback and helps Shazza and Ken once more. Ty also befriends Dennis, a cowardly green tree frog, and helps him get to his home by lighting up the path along the way with his Flamerangs. In the Snowy Mountains, he also rescues a group of koala children who are lost in the snow. As Julius finds the second talisman, Cass stations another one of his henchmen, the mechanical shark Crikey, to intercept Ty. Ty jumps across a group of platforms and, after using the oxygen tanks, defeats Crikey. Using the remaining energy from the ice Thunder Eggs, Julius constructs a new set of boomerangs for Ty, the "Frostyrangs".

Ty puts out a group of bushfires using the Frostyrangs and enters Lake Burril. Having discovered that Ty is the one collecting the talismans and Thunder Eggs, Cass deploys Sly, another one of his high-ranking henchmen and fellow Tasmanian Tiger, to eliminate him. As Ty makes his way through another rain forest (while being continually misguided by a lyrebird named Lenny), he confronts and defeats Sly inside the rainforest's factory. Ty later saves the koala children again and puts out more bushfires on a snowy mountain, as well as passing through a group of tropical islands. When the third talisman is located, Ty finds and battles a female thorny devil (later revealed to be Fluffy), another of Cass's henchmen. Despite attacking with her giant mechanical Yeti, Ty manages defeats her and acquires the third talisman. Julius then constructs mighty "Thunderangs" from the excess Thunder Egg energy, giving the new boomerangs to Ty.

After gathering enough golden cogs and Thunder Eggs, as well as being told that the last two talismans are presumably in Cass's possession, Ty enters a rainforest leading to Cass's lair while avoiding booby traps and Cass's minions. Inside the lair, Ty encounters Shazza again. Cass has another of his henchmen, Shadow the bat, capture Shazza. Ty defeats Shadow, rescues Shazza, and acquires the fourth talisman. After another confrontation with Sly, Ty defeats him and rescues him from falling into a pit of lava, but Sly vows to exact revenge. Ty finds Boss Cass and his massive robot, the Neo Fluffy X, and the two battle. Using his father's Doomarang given to him by Sly, Ty destroys the robot and sends Cass falling out of the sky. After giving the Bunyip elder the last talisman, his parents arrive from the Dreaming.

Development
Development of Ty the Tasmanian Tiger began in December 2000, originally consisting of five developers at Krome Studios. The development team was later expanded to 40 people and also included a quality assurance team of 15 members. In designing the 16 large levels, the team drew inspiration from the Australian landscapes. According to designer John Passfield, he said that his favorite boomerang in the game was the Kaboomerang. The team also implemented real time lighting effects, and Passfield cited that it "affects Ty [throughout the game] and changes the direction of his shadow, plus the world reflects in ice cubes and shiny surfaces" and he also loved the animation system used in the game. He also cited that he was proud of the "Emergent Game Play" system used throughout the game, and said that "during focus testing [of the game] it was great when players had 'stumbled across' a new way to solve a problem".

Ty the Tasmanian Tiger was first announced by Electronic Arts on 10 May 2002, and the game was later unveiled at the 2002 Electronic Entertainment Expo convention to positive response. On 17 July 2002, Electronic Arts announced that the game would also be developed for the Xbox.

Reception

Ty the Tasmanian Tiger received "mixed or average" reviews, according to review aggregator Metacritic. Matthew Gallant of GameSpot concluded that the game is "great for younger players and can provide a satisfying experience for teens and adults as long as they don't mind their replay value coming from finding every last collectible in the game." In reviewing the PlayStation 2 version of the game, Jeremy Dunham and Kaiser Hwang of IGN concluded that the game is "a Crash Bandicoot clone through and through" and also said that "Krome Studios own attempt at platforming is still enough to warrant a purchase from diehard genre fans." In a review of the Xbox version, Hwang said that it "makes no effort in hiding its influences" and that the game "is a Mario clone through and through, just done really well."

The gameplay received mixed responses. Kaiser Hwang commented that the game "borrows heavily from the Mario series." However he complained that one of the "irritating things about the game is that every time you start your game and begin a level, the game insists on showing you the same cutscene and voiceover." He also said that the game has "clever puzzles, and the levels have a good variety to them." Kilo Watt of GamePro said that controlling Ty is "a bit cumbersome with jumping being particularly tough to get a handle on." He also cited the camera angles as problematic, as well as detecting collisions in the game.

The game sold over one million copies worldwide. The PlayStation 2 version of the game was re-released for the Greatest Hits budget lineup in 2003.

Legacy
Ty the Tasmanian Tiger was followed by two sequels, Ty the Tasmanian Tiger 2: Bush Rescue and Ty the Tasmanian Tiger 3: Night of the Quinkan, for the PlayStation 2, GameCube, Xbox and Game Boy Advance and developed by Krome Studios. In May 2005, Activision and Krome Studios signed a co-publishing agreement for the third installment of the series: Ty the Tasmanian Tiger 3: Night of the Quinkan. It was released in October the next year.

On 27 July 2012, Krome announced plans for a new Ty The Tasmanian Tiger game to be developed for the iOS to coincide with the series's 10th anniversary, this game was revealed to be Ty the Tasmanian Tiger: Boomerang Blast, released late 2012. On 11 March 2013, Krome Studios announced a 2D Ty title to be released on 24 July 2013 on Xbox Games for Windows 8 PC and/or Tablet. Ty the Tasmanian Tiger 4 was originally released on Xbox Games for Windows 8 PC and tablets titled Ty the Tasmanian Tiger in 2013 then ported to Steam for Microsoft Windows as Ty the Tasmanian Tiger 4 in 2015. It was released on 18 September 2015.

Krome Studios organized a successful Kickstarter crowdfunding campaign for a remastered version of the original game titled Ty the Tasmanian Tiger HD. It was released on the Nintendo Switch in North America, available from the Nintendo eShop on 31 March 2020. It was released in Europe on 3 April and in Australia and New Zealand on 4 April. It was also released for the PlayStation 4 on 25 July 2020 and for the Xbox One on 14 October 2020. It was announced to be playable on the upcoming Xbox Series X/S as well.

A physical version of the remaster was released for Xbox One, PlayStation 4 and Nintendo Switch on 15 October 2021. A special edition for Nintendo Switch containing Ty the Tasmanian Tiger 2: Bush Rescue HD was released on the same day.

Canceled television series
It was announced in 2004 that Film Roman and Krome Studios was developing an animated series based on the video game series. No further reports, however, have been made since then, and the project is believed to be cancelled.

Notes

References

External links
 Krome Studios official website
 
 Krome Studios' Ty the Tasmanian Tiger webpage

 
2002 video games
3D platform games
Anthropomorphic video game characters
Electronic Arts games
GameCube games
Krome Studios games
Nintendo Switch games
PlayStation 2 games
PlayStation 4 games
Steampunk video games
Video games developed in Australia
Video games set in Australia
Windows games
Xbox games
Xbox One games
Single-player video games